Azufre Point is a headland lying  southeast of Cape Renard on the south side of Flandres Bay, on the west coast of Graham Land. It was first charted by the Belgian Antarctic Expedition under Adrien de Gerlache, 1897–99, and later charted by the Argentine Antarctic Expedition (1954) and named "Punta Azufre" ("sulfur point").

References
 

Headlands of Graham Land
Danco Coast